Laboratory is an unincorporated community in Washington County, Pennsylvania, United States.  It is home to the Moses Little Tavern.

An early variant name was "Pancake", after George Pancake, a pioneer citizen. Laboratory has been noted for its unusual place name.

References

Unincorporated communities in Washington County, Pennsylvania
Unincorporated communities in Pennsylvania